Charpai, Charpaya, Charpoy, Khat or Manji (Hindi : चारपाई, Bengali: চারপায়া, Urdu: چارپائی, Saraiki, Punjabi; char "four" + paya "footed") is a traditional woven bed used across South Asia. Regional variations are found in Afghanistan and Pakistan, North and Central India, Bihar and Myanmar. It is also known as khaat, khatia, or manji, and as manjaa in Punjab.

The charpai is a simple design that is easy to construct. It was traditionally made out of a wooden frame and natural-fiber ropes, but modern charpais may have metal frames and plastic tapes. The frame is four strong vertical posts connected by four horizontal members; the design makes the construction self-leveling. Webbing can be made out of cotton, date leaves, and other natural fibers. 

There are many interpretations of the traditional design, and over the years craftspeople have innovated with the weave patterns and materials used. The weaving is done in many ways, e.g. a diagonal cross (bias) weave, with one end woven short, and laced to the endpiece, for tensioning adjustments (which helps in controlling the sagging of the bed as it ages with use).

It is mostly used in warm areas: in cold areas, a similar rope bed would be topped (with an insulating palliasse or tick, stuffed with straw, chaff, or down feathers), and possibly hung with curtains.

In the 1300s, Ibn Battuta described the charpai as having "four conical legs with four crosspieces of wood on which braids of silk or cotton are woven. When one lies down on it, there is no need for anything to make it pliable, for it is pliable of itself."

Adapted charpais were used as colonial campaign furniture.

Gallery

See also 

Niwar (cotton tape) used for stringing charpais
Rope bed
Klinē (Classical Greek)

References

Beds
Indian culture
Pakistani culture
History of furniture
Punjabi words and phrases
Desi culture
Indian furniture
Portable furniture